The British International School of Boston (formerly known as the British School of Boston) is a non-sectarian, co-educational college preparatory day school located in the Moss Hill section of the Jamaica Plain neighborhood in Boston, MA. BISB offers education for ages 3 to 18 (UK Nursery to Year 13/US Pre-K to Grade 12). The school opened in September 2000 and was the third school opened in the United States by the British Schools of America. Today, BISB is part of Nord Anglia Education, a provider of international schools with the headquarters in Hong Kong that was acquired by the Canada Pension Plan Investment Board and Baring Private Equity Asia in 2017.
The British International School of Boston relocated in 2004 from Dedham, Massachusetts to its current location Showa Boston campus in the Moss Hill section of Jamaica Plain, Massachusetts, a satellite campus for Showa Women's University in Tokyo, Japan.

Enrollment and Student Profile

The British International School of Boston's current enrollment comprises approximately 414 students.  Approximately 65% of students are American and 10% are British.
Large contingents of students are from Spain, Russia, The Netherlands, Brazil, Australia, Italy and many other countries. There are over seventy nationalities represented at the school. The school serves Nursery School (18 Months) to Year 13 (toddler to Grade 12).

Affiliation and Associations
The British International School of Boston is accredited to offer the IB Diploma Programme (IBDP) and the International General Certificate of Secondary Education (IGSCE). The school is an active member of the European Council for International Schools (ECIS) and the Council for International Schools in the Americas (CISTA).

See also

American schools in the United Kingdom:
 The American School in London
 American School in England

Further reading
Brems, Lisa. "GRASSY DUNES." Boston Globe. 9 April 2000. South Weekly 3. "The British School of Washington D.C. plans to open a branch in Dedham in September The private school to be called the British School of Boston will occupy[...]"

References

External links
School website

2000 establishments in Massachusetts
British-American culture in Massachusetts
Boston
Private high schools in Massachusetts
Private elementary schools in Massachusetts
Private middle schools in Massachusetts
Private preparatory schools in Massachusetts
United Kingdom–United States relations
Elementary schools in Boston
Middle schools in Boston
High schools in Boston
Educational institutions established in 2000
Nord Anglia Education
Schools in Dedham, Massachusetts